Boshier is a surname. Notable people with the surname include:

Brian Boshier (1932–2009), English cricketer
Derek Boshier (born 1937), English artist
Lachlan Boshier (born 1994), New Zealand rugby union player
Nicholas Boshier, Australian actor

See also
David Boshier-Jones, British racing driver